Anna Kathleen Rice (born 19 August 1980) is a Canadian badminton player. She attended Handsworth Secondary School, and completed a B.A. from the University of British Columbia.

Career 
In 1999, Rice represented British Columbia competed at the Canada Winter Games in Corner Brook, clinched the women's singles title and runner-up in the women's doubles. In 2000, Rice moved to Denmark to play in the Danish Club League and to train at the International Badminton Academy under coach Michael Kjeldsen. She was two times Olympian and five times National Champion.

In Athens 2004 Summer Olympics, in women's doubles with partner Denyse Julien. They were defeated by Saralee Thungthongkam and Sathinee Chankrachangwong of Thailand. She also competed in Badminton at the 2008 Summer Olympics and was a round-of-16 finalist, being the first North American player to do so. In Beijing 2008, she competed in the singles event. She reached the third round, beating Eva Lee of the United States and Jeanine Cicognini of Switzerland before she was defeated by Lu Lan in straight games.

She won the Canadian National Championships in 2004, 2005, 2008, 2009, and 2010. She has also won the U.S. Open title in 2009 and Pan American women's singles champion in 2007 and 2009. She also won two silver medals at the 2003 Pan American Games in the women's singles and doubles event. Rice participated in the 2006 and 2010 Commonwealth Games, reaching the quarter finals in 2010. Her highest world ranking was 18, the highest in Canadian history until Michelle Li achieved a ranking of 11.

Rice is coached by Julia Chen and Michael Kjeldsen. She now focuses her time directing the coaching program and offering badminton lessons at Badminton Vancouver as well as coaching online through Better Badminton.

Achievements

Pan American Games 
Women's singles

Women's doubles

Pan Am Championships 
Women's singles

BWF Grand Prix 
The BWF Grand Prix had two levels, the Grand Prix and Grand Prix Gold. It was a series of badminton tournaments sanctioned by the Badminton World Federation (BWF) and played between 2007 and 2017.

Women's singles

  BWF Grand Prix Gold tournament
  BWF Grand Prix tournament

BWF International Challenge/Series 
Women's singles

Women's doubles

  BWF International Challenge tournament
  BWF International Series tournament

References

External links 
 
 
 
 
 
 
 

1980 births
Living people
Sportspeople from North Vancouver
Canadian female badminton players
Badminton players at the 2004 Summer Olympics
Badminton players at the 2008 Summer Olympics
Olympic badminton players of Canada
Badminton players at the 2003 Pan American Games
Pan American Games silver medalists for Canada
Pan American Games medalists in badminton
Badminton players at the 2010 Commonwealth Games
Badminton players at the 2006 Commonwealth Games
Medalists at the 2003 Pan American Games
Commonwealth Games competitors for Canada